Jan Kopp may refer to:
 Jan Kopp (composer)
 Jan Kopp (artist)